"Break the Rules" is a song by English singer Charli XCX from her second studio album, Sucker (2014). It was released on 19 August 2014 as the album's second single. In a 2020 interview with Red Bull, XCX stated that she regrets recording the track.

Composition

"Break the Rules" is an electro-rock and alternative rock song, set against a "propulsive" synth-pop groove. The song is written in the key of E major in common time with a tempo of 124 beats per minute.  "Break the Rules" follows a chord progression of C5–B5–A5–E5–F5, and Charli's vocals span from B3 to C5.

Critical reception 
Cosmopolitan listed "Break the Rules" at number five on its 2014 best songs list. Ahead of the release of her 2022 album Crash, Consequence of Sound ranked the song as Charli's best, which she disagreed with.

Music video
The music video for "Break the Rules" was directed by Marc Klasfeld and premiered on 25 August 2014. The video was filmed at Birmingham High School while class was in session, so the lyrics "getting high and getting wrecked" had to be muted during playbacks. According to Charli, the video draws inspiration from films such as Carrie (1976), The Craft (1996) and Jawbreaker (1999). It features a cameo from actress Rose McGowan, the star of Jawbreaker, as a school chaperone.

Usage in media
The song was used in trailers for the 2015 film Goosebumps. The song was also used in a 2016 Dish Network commercial and as the theme song of season 7 of Vietnam's Next Top Model. It is also used in both trailers for the 2020 film My Spy.

Track listings
Digital download
"Break the Rules" – 3:23

Digital download – Remixes
"Break the Rules" (Tiësto Remix) – 4:25
"Break the Rules" (Odesza Remix) – 4:00
"Break the Rules" (Broods Remix) – 2:52

German CD single
"Break the Rules" – 3:23
"Break the Rules" (Tiësto Remix) – 4:25

Australian CD single – Schoolies Edition
"Break the Rules" – 3:23
"Break the Rules" (Tiësto Remix) – 4:25
"Break the Rules" (ODESZA Remix) – 4:00
"Break the Rules" (Broods Remix) – 2:52
"Boom Clap" – 2:49

Credits and personnel
Credits for "Break the Rules" are adapted from CD liner notes
Recording locations
 Recorded at Rokstone Studios, London
 Recorded at Westlake Audio, Los Angeles
 Mixed at Hot Rock Studios
Personnel

 Songwriting – Charlotte Aitchison, Dan Omelio, Magnus August Høiberg, Tor Erik Hermansen, Steve Mac
 Mixing – Rob Orton
 Engineering – Chris Laws, Dann Pursey, Tony Lake
 Producing – Cashmere Cat, Stargate, Steve Mac
 Programming – Cashmere Cat

 Bass – Steve Pearce
 Drums – Chris Laws
 Guitar – Dan "Robopop" Omelio
 Keyboards – Steve Mac
 Percussion – Daniel Pursey
 Vocals – Bea Rexstrew, Charli XCX, Katie Littlewood, Kirstin Hume, Macy McCutcheon

Charts

Weekly charts

Year-end charts

Certifications

Release history

References

External links
 

2014 singles
2014 songs
Atlantic Records singles
Charli XCX songs
Music videos directed by Marc Klasfeld
Songs about drugs
Songs about school
Songs written by Charli XCX
Songs written by Robopop
Songs written by Steve Mac
Songs written by Tor Erik Hermansen
Songs written by Mikkel Storleer Eriksen
Songs written by Cashmere Cat
Song recordings produced by Cashmere Cat
Song recordings produced by Stargate (record producers)
Song recordings produced by Steve Mac